Purple chokeberry is a common name for several plants and may refer to:

Aronia prunifolia, native to eastern North America
Malus floribunda, native to eastern Asia and cultivated as an ornamental